Abdu Ali is a Black 
multidisciplinary musician, community activist, poet and artist based in Baltimore. In 2019, Baltimore City Major Jack Young's Office and the LGBTQ Commission honored Ali with the Artist of the Year Award. They released their first album FIYAH!! in 2019.

Musical style 
Their musical style has been described as fervent jazz with a futuristic punk rap poetry while also weaving noise punk to avant-garde rap. Their work is inspired by Baltimore Club legend and black queer icon Miss Tony. Ali's lyrics and poetry are influenced by Langston Hughes, Zora Neale Hurston, Wallace Thurmon, and Richard Nugent. The FADER described their single "Chastity" as "an unconventional, and daring call for self-love and acceptance".

Projects 
Ali has been involved in various projects including Kahlon, an experimental music and art event in Baltimore that hosted notable acts including Juliana Huxtable, Princess Nokia and others that lasted from 2014-2017. In 2017 they created drumBOOTY, a podcast for black creativity and social dialogue.  They are also the founder of As They Lay, which Ali states as a "creative protect-based organism" that brings black artists together for events, programs and dialogues.

Discography

Studio albums 
 FIYAH!! (2019)

Guest appearances

References

External links

Living people
Year of birth missing (living people)
Place of birth missing (living people)
African-American musicians
American LGBT musicians
Musicians from Baltimore
Non-binary musicians
Non-binary writers
Non-binary artists
Non-binary activists
LGBT people from Maryland
21st-century African-American people
21st-century American LGBT people